Tanganyicia is a genus of tropical freshwater snails with an operculum, aquatic gastropod mollusks in the family Paludomidae.

Before 2002 this genus was placed within the family Thiaridae.

Species 
Brown (1994) considered Tanganyicia rufofilosa a very variable species and the only species within the genus Tanganyicia. Later, in 1999, another species was described.

Species within the genus Tanganyicia include:
 Tanganyicia michelae (West, 1999)
 Tanganyicia rufofilosa (Smith, 1880) - type species

References 

Paludomidae
Taxonomy articles created by Polbot
Snails of Lake Tanganyika